The 1976 Summer Olympics, officially known as the Games of the XXI Olympiad, were a summer multi-sport event held in Montreal, Quebec, Canada, from July 17 to August 1, 1976. A total of 6,084 athletes from 92 countries represented by National Olympic Committees (NOCs) participated in these Games, competing in 198 events in 23 sports.

Twenty-eight African countries boycotted these Games. This decision was taken in response to the participation of New Zealand, because its national rugby union team (the All Blacks) continued to play rugby with South Africa, which had been banned from the Olympic movement since 1964 due to its apartheid policies.

Athletes from 42 countries won at least one medal, leaving 51 countries in blank in the medals table.  The Soviet Union won the highest number of gold medals (49) and overall medals (125). The Games were dominated by the Soviet Bloc, with the USSR and its satellites occupying seven out of top ten places in the medal standings. Thailand and Bermuda won the first medals in their Olympic history, with Bermuda being the least populous territory to ever win a Summer Olympic medal until Alessandra Perilli won bronze for San Marino in trap shooting in 2020. The Montreal Summer Olympics proved disastrous to Canada not only in financial terms; it failed to  win a single gold medal despite being the host nation. Overall, it was 27th in the medal table, which remains the worst result a host nation has ever scored in the history of the Summer Games.

Russian Nikolai Andrianov of the Soviet Union won seven medals (four gold, two silver and one bronze medals), becoming the most medaled athlete in these Games.

Medal table

The medal table is based on information provided by the International Olympic Committee (IOC) and is consistent with IOC convention in its published medal tables. By default, the table is ordered by the number of gold medals the athletes from a nation have won (in this context, a nation is an entity represented by a National Olympic Committee). The number of silver medals is taken into consideration next and then the number of bronze medals. If nations are still tied, equal ranking is given and they are listed alphabetically.

A total of 198 events in 23 different sports were contested at the Montreal Games. In boxing and judo, two bronze medals were awarded for each weight class. In gymnastics, two bronze medals were awarded for third–place ties in the men's pommel horse and men's horizontal bar events, and a second–place tie in the women's vault resulted in two silver medals and no bronze medal awarded for that event.

Change by doping

References

External links
 
 
 
 
 
 
 

Medal count
1976